Robyne Dunn (born 1963) is an Australian jazz singer, songwriter and pianist. She was nominated for the 1990 ARIA Award for Best Female Artist with the vinyl Labour Of Liberty,   In 1992, she also recorded the song "You and Me" with Geoff Robertson & Kevin Bennett for the Yoram Gross movie Blinky Bill: The Mischievous Koala.

Discography

Albums

Live albums

Extended plays

References

External links
 Robyne Dunn at IMDb

Australian women singers
Living people
1963 births
Blinky Bill